SMJK Sin Min (新民国民型中学) (Sekolah Menengah Jenis Kebangsaan Sin Min) is a Chinese conforming school which is located in Sungai Petani, Kedah, Malaysia. The school won the Anugerah Sekolah Harapan Negara in the "Secondary Schools (City)" category of the whole Malaysia in 2006 and the Anugerah Sekolah Cemerlang in 2007. In 2009 the school was awarded the status of Sekolah Kluster Kecemerlangan (Cluster School Of Excellence). The school is focusing on both Co-curriculum and curriculum.

Official website 
 SMJK Sin Min Web Portal (Chinese)
 SMJK Sin Min Official Website

Sources 
 DoctorJob.com.my - Happenings
 iSchool >> Customer Success Stories - SMJK Schools

Secondary schools in Malaysia
Schools in Kedah
Educational institutions established in 1957
1957 establishments in Malaya
Chinese-language schools in Malaysia